The Schulich School of Law is the law school of Dalhousie University in Halifax, Nova Scotia, Canada. Founded in 1883 as Dalhousie Law School, it is the oldest university-based common law school in Canada. It adopted its current name in October 2009 after receiving a $20-million endowment from Canadian businessman and philanthropist Seymour Schulich.

Today, the Schulich School of Law is the largest law school in Atlantic Canada. With 500 students enrolled each year (170 in first-year) and a faculty of Rhodes, Fulbright, and Trudeau scholars, the school promises “one of the most prestigious and comprehensive legal educations in North America.”

History
Located in Halifax, Nova Scotia, a maritime city on the east coast of Canada, the Schulich School of Law is rooted in the vision of its first dean, Richard Chapman Weldon, who believed lawyers had a responsibility to contribute to their communities' well-being.

Unlike his contemporaries at Osgoode Hall Law School at York University (which was established in 1862 under the auspices of the Law Society of Upper Canada), Weldon aspired to treat the study of law as a full-time, liberal education. It was not, as Osgoode was, an outpost for the province's professional law society where law was seen as "merely a technical craft."

At the time of its founding, the establishment of a university common law school was so radical – and its subsequent influence so great – that legal historians cite Dal Law as the basis for law school today.

In W. Wesley Pue's Story of Legal Education in British Columbia, a book that chronicles the establishment of the University of British Columbia Faculty of Law 62 years after Dalhousie Law School first opened, Pue notes that:
In discussing the motivations that led to the establishment of a full-time common law school, Weldon described the "'legitimate ambition' of 'generous spirits who wish their country well' to build a law school 'that shall influence the intellectual life of Canada as Harvard and Yale have influenced the intellectual life of New England.'"

Based on Weldon's comments in his inaugural address at the opening of the law school, it's unsurprising that the Schulich School of Law has shared a storied connection with Harvard University. Although Dalhousie was influenced early on by the high standards of academic excellence set by Harvard Law School, it placed a decidedly unique emphasis on the subjects of public law, constitutional history, and international law, fields that were notably absent from Harvard's curriculum in the 1880s.

Reputation

The school was ranked in the top three Canadian law schools in Corporate Knights'''  2011 Knight Schools Survey. Maclean's 2013 ranking of Canadian common law schools placed the school sixth out of 16. The Schulich School of Law was also the first Canadian law school awarded the Emil Gumpuert Award by the American College of Trial Lawyers for excellence in trial advocacy training.

Location
In 1966, the school moved to its current home, the Weldon Law Building, on Dalhousie's Studley Campus. On August 16, 1985, a lightning strike caused a short in Weldon's electrical system, which started a fire that destroyed most of the Sir James Dunn Law Library. The library reopened four years later in 1989.

Refurbishments to the Weldon Law Building took place in 2004 with the addition of the James and Barbara Palmer Wing and in 2016 with the Facade Renewal Project. In phases one and two of the Facade Renewal Project, windows were replaced, walls were insulated, and stonework was reinforced on the third and fourth floors of the building. In phases three and four, construction was focused on the building's first and second floors. Here, crews removed existing stonework, installed an accessible ramp to the school's entrance on University Avenue, and redid the school's front entrance.

Inside the building, the centre staircase that existed between the first and second floor has been removed to make way for the creation of modern administrative office space on the second floor to provide a new and improved area for the administrative staff. Importantly, the faculty's mosaic laid initially at the top of the stairs on the second floor and which weighs close to 2,500 lbs. was carefully preserved and laid outside of the new administrative space.

Programs

In January 2011, the Senate voted to change Dalhousie's law degree designation from a Bachelor of Laws (LLB) to a Juris Doctor (JD). Students attending the Schulich School of Law today can undertake a regular JD degree or concentrate their JD in one of four specific areas: health law, business law/corporate law, marine and environmental law, and law and technology.

The school also offers a variety of combined-degree programs for undergraduate students:
 JD/MBA (Master of Business Administration)
 JD/MPA (Master of Public Administration)
 JD/MI (Master of Information)
 JD/MHA (Master of Health Administration)
 JD/MJ (Master of Journalism). The JD/MJ combination is the first of its kind in Canada.
The Schulich School of Law also gives 20 to 30 aspiring professors and jurists who wish to enhance their knowledge of law and specialize in a particular areas/areas of law the option to pursue a postgraduate degree at the school:
 LLM (Master of Laws)
 PhD (Doctor of Philosophy)
 MEC (Master of Electronic Commerce)
 Interdisciplinary PhD program
As an accredited law school in Canada, graduates are eligible to proceed to bar admission and articling programs throughout the country. Further information on bar admission for accredited Canadian law school graduates and the National Committee on Accreditation (NCA) for foreign-trained law graduates is available at the Federation of Law Societies of Canada website.

Admissions
At the Schulich School of Law, GPAs are weighed at 60 per cent and LSAT scores at 40 per cent. In 2016, 170 students were admitted from a pool of over 1,300 applicants, of which 55 per cent were women and 45 per cent men. The average age of applicants was 25. The Schulich School of Law's two application deadlines are November 30 and February 28.

Applications are reviewed by a committee of faculty and student members. Most offers of admission are made on the basis of the information provided in the student's application. In some circumstances, the admissions committee may require applicants to sit for an interview. Interviews take place in May and June and in recent years have been conducted in Halifax, Toronto, Calgary, and Vancouver.

Most applicants have obtained an undergraduate degree before they begin law school; those with just two years of university work, however, will be considered for admission if their academic standing is exceptionally high.

Achievements in extracurricular and employment activities are an asset for all applicants. Candidates who, despite economic, cultural, racial, or ethnic disadvantages, have made exceptional contributions to the community, or who have shown exceptional capacity to respond to challenges, may be given special consideration.

Special consideration is also given to applicants who are members of Nova Scotia's Black or Mi'kmaq communities. Native applicants who are not eligible for the Indigenous Blacks & Mi'kmaq Initiative and whose academic backgrounds do not meet admissions standards are eligible to apply for admission to the Schulich School of Law through successful completion of the Program of Legal Studies for Native People at the University of Saskatchewan's College of Law.

 Indigenous Blacks & Mi'kmaq Initiative 
The Indigenous Blacks & Mi'kmaq (IB&M) Initiative at the Schulich School of Law was established in 1989 to increase the representation of these community members in the legal profession. The initiative develops scholarships in the areas of Aboriginal and African Canadian legal perspectives, promotes the hiring and retention of graduates, and provides eligible students with financial and other types of support.

 Areas of expertise 
 Marine and environmental law
 Law and technology
 Cyberbullying
 Health law and Health policy
 Business law: Corporate Law and Commercial Law
 Corporate Theory
 Corporate Governance
 E-Commerce
 Fiduciary law
 Tax law
 Intellectual Property law
 Constitutional law
 Charter of Rights and Freedoms
 Canadian Aboriginal law
 Family law
 Food law
 Labour law
 Feminist Legal Theory
 Human rights law
 International law
 Comparative law
 Legal ethics
 Jurisprudence
 Mental Health law
 Restorative justice
 Trust Law
 Equity law

 Research institutes 
The law school is home to the Health Law Institute, the Law and Technology Institute, and the Marine and Environmental Law Institute.

 Marine and Environmental Law Institute 

The Marine and Environmental Law Institute directs the academic specialization for the Marine & Environmental Law Program (MELP). It is internationally recognized for excellence in marine and environmental law teaching and research and has one of the world's most extensive course offerings. In addition to its publication activities, the Institute provides advisory services to agencies around the world.

 Law and Technology Institute 

The Law and Technology Institute (LATI) fosters interdisciplinary undergraduate and graduate studies with Dalhousie's Faculty of Computer Science and Faculty of Management. Core curriculum and course offerings include Biotechnology, Internet law, Privacy Law, Electronic Commerce, Intellectual Property, and the Commercialization of Research.

 Health Law Institute 

The Schulich School of Law's interdisciplinary Health Law Institute works alongside Dalhousie's Faculties of Medicine, Health Professions, and Dentistry. The Institute is committed to the advancement of health law and policy through scholarly analysis, professional education, and public service. Numerous grants and awards have allowed Institute members to focus on cutting-edge topics such as research involving humans; end-of-life treatment, policy, and practice; and public health emergencies.

 Dalhousie Legal Aid Service 
The Dalhousie Legal Aid Service was founded in 1970. It provides important legal services to the Halifax area and brings together third-year law students, practising lawyers, and community actors. It is the oldest clinical law program in Canada and the only community law clinic in Nova Scotia. Students can receive academic credit and gain practical legal experience through the Legal Aid Service, which emphasizes the development of professional skills and the refinement of substantive and procedural knowledge in a real-life context.

 Career development 
Students can find a job placement or articling position with support from the Schulich School of Law's in-house Career Development Office (CDO). The CDO helps students and graduates seek permanent jobs, summer jobs, internship placements, and other law-related employment. Assistance with résumé writing is available, as well as general career counseling and information about graduate legal studies and scholarships. Students can also find information about alternative or public interest careers here. Most Schulich School of Law students seek summer internships with firms, NGOs, think tanks, businesses, governments, and charities to gain valuable skills and work experience. Students can find funding for these placements by visiting the CDO.

Student life
Domus Legis Society

Law student life at Dalhousie is known for its collegiality and tradition. The student-run Domus Legis Society (better known as Domus Legis) was founded in 1965 and is Canada's oldest social society for law students. ("Domus Legis" is derived from Latin and means "House of Law.") It was created by Dalhousie law students "to promote good fellowship among congenial men and women at the Faculty of Law of Dalhousie University; to encourage a high standard of professional work; and to assist by every honourable means the advancement of its members."Domus Legis functions independently from the university administration and receives support from alumni and Canadian law firms. The society adheres to a constitution and is run by an annually elected executive of students from the Faculty of Law. Despite its independence, Domus Legis has close customary ties to faculty, alumni, visiting justices, and the Dean, who is given honorary designation as Member #1.

Over the years, traditions have grown to include the customary signing of the Domus Legis Society's walls by law graduates and visiting dignitaries. The last of this tradition is proudly displayed in the Weldon Law building student lounge with the signature "Homeless Class of 2005." The original building that housed the society was located at 1255 Seymour St., which was demolished in January 2004.

Despite their headquarters' demolition, Domus Legis's traditions live on in the weekly Domus Night, which takes place every Thursday, and the annual Halloween party, which attracts law students and members of other faculties. Efforts to acquire a new home for Domus Legis continue along with alumni support. Domus Legis membership is open to all Schulich School of Law students.

Dalhousie Law Students' Society

The Dalhousie Law Students' Society (LSS) is the elected student government of the Schulich School of Law. It is composed of seven executive members, with representatives from each section in first year, three representatives each from second and third year, a Black students' representative, an Aboriginal students' representative, a chair, and a secretary. The society represents the student voice in all aspects of the law school, including social, financial, athletic, and academic.

Dalhousie Journal of Legal Studies

The Dalhousie Journal of Legal Studies (DJLS) is a non-profit academic law journal that publishes work from current law students and recent alumni. Established in 1991, the DJLS promotes reflection and debate on contemporary legal issues. As one of the only publications of its kind in Canada, the journal serves as a unique vehicle for law students to publish their work. The DJLS is published once per academic year and maintains a broad subscription base that includes law firms, law school libraries, corporations, government departments, alumni, and legal professionals from around the globe. It is also indexed in the HeinOnline database.

An entirely student-run publication, the DJLS is managed by an editorial board. More than 70 student volunteers assist in its production and publication. It is distinct from the Dalhousie Law Journal, a peer-reviewed publication produced by Schulich School of Law faculty members.

The Weldon TimesThe Weldon Times is a law student run newspaper established in 1975.

Notable alumni
The Schulich School of Law at Dalhousie University has produced a number of accomplished alumni over the course of its history, including over 300 judicial appointments to every level of court in every province of Canada. The law school's alumni, for example, constitute 20 per cent of the Federal Court of Canada and 25 per cent of the Tax Court of Canada.

Notable alumni include:

Prime ministers

 Rt. Hon. Richard Bedford Bennett (1893) – 11th prime minister of Canada; only Canadian prime minister raised to the English peerage as 1st Viscount Bennett
 Rt. Hon. Brian Mulroney (finished first year but completed studies at Université Laval) 18th Prime Minister of Canada
 Rt. Hon. Joe Clark (finished first year but left to pursue freelance journalism in British Columbia) 16th Prime Minister of Canada

Justices of the Supreme Court of Canada
 Hon. Edmund Leslie NewcombePuisne Justice of the Supreme Court of Canada
 Roland Ritchie, CCPuisne Justice of the Supreme Court of Canada
 Robert SedgewickPuisne Justice of the Supreme Court of Canada
 Bertha Wilson (1957), OC first female Justice of the Supreme Court of Canada

Justices of international courts

 Ronald St. John MacDonald, OC (1952)law professor and international law expert; only non-European ever appointed as a justice of the European Court of Human Rights; Honorary Professor of Law at China's Peking University
 John Erskine Read, OC (1909) law dean; international law scholar; only Canadian ever appointed as a justice of the International Court of Justice (served until 1958)

Other notable justices

 Sir Joseph Andrew Chisholm KBE (1886) – former mayor of Halifax; first Chief Justice of the Supreme Court of Nova Scotia; last judge to be knighted in Canada
 Constance Glube (1955) – former Chief Justice of Nova Scotia; first female Chief Justice in Canada
 Frederic William Howay FRSC (1890) – historian, lawyer, and jurist; "primary authority" on many aspects of B.C. history in the mid-20th century;[28] today considered "father of the study of British Columbia's nautical history"[29] 
William Andrew MacKay (1953) – former Justice of the Federal Court of Canada; Foreign Service Officer with the Department of External Affairs; and Ford Foundation Fellow at Harvard University
 John Keiller MacKay, OC (1922) – former judge of Supreme Court of Ontario; llieutenant-governor of Ontario; awarded the Distinguished Service Order in 1916 for "conspicuous gallantry in action"[30] in the Battle of the Somme
 Clyde Wells (1962) – Chief Justice of Newfoundland Court of Appeal; fifth Premier of Newfoundland and Labrador

Lawmakers / politicians

 Hon. Jim Cowan (1965) – Senator representing Nova Scotia and leader of the Liberals in the Senate
 Hon. John Crosbie (1956) – former Canadian Minister of Finance; former llieutenant-governor of Newfoundland and Labrador
 Mary Dawson (1970) - Conflict of Interest and Ethics Commissioner of Canada
 David Charles Dingwall (B.Comm 1974, LL.B. 1979) – former Liberal cabinet minister
 Hanson Dowell (1930), president of the Canadian Amateur Hockey Association and member of the Nova Scotia House of Assembly
 Howard Epstein (LL.B. 1973, faculty) – MLA for Halifax Chebucto
 Hon. George Furey (1983) – Senator representing Newfoundland and Labrador and Speaker of the Senate
 Danny Graham (1987) – former leader of the Liberal Party of Nova Scotia
 Megan Leslie (2004)former Member of Parliament for Halifax
 Richard McBride, KCMG (1890) – lawyer; British Columbia politician; considered the founder of the British Columbia Conservative Party
 Hon. Peter MacKay (1991) – former Minister of National Defence; former Federal Justice Minister and Attorney General of Canada
 M.A. MacPherson (1913) – former Attorney-General of Saskatchewan
 Stewart McInnes (1961) – former Conservative cabinet minister
 Hon. Anne McLellan, OC (1974) – law professor and former Liberal deputy prime minister
 Peter Milliken, PC (1971) lawyer; politician; served as Speaker of the House for 10 years beginning in 2001
 Reid Morden (1963) – former Canadian Security Intelligence Service director
 Hon. Donald Oliver (1964) – first black male Canadian Senator
 Geoff Plant (1981) – former Attorney General of British Columbia
 Hon. Geoff Regan, PC (1983)Member of Parliament for Halifax West; Speaker of the House of Commons
 Hon. Gerald Regan (1954)former Liberal cabinet minister
 Graham Steele (1989) – former Minister of Finance of Nova Scotia; Member of the Nova Scotia Legislature

Academics / scholars

 Innis H. Christie (1962) – law dean; one Canada's "great labour law scholars" and a central figure in the establishment of employment law in Canada.
 Meinhard Doelle (1990)law scholar; drafter of the Environment Act of Nova Scotia
 Murray Fraser (1960)law scholar; founding dean of University of Victoria Faculty of Law 
 Edgar Gold, OC (1973)Australian-Canadian expert in international ocean law and marine and environmental policy 
 Vincent C MacDonald (1920)law dean; academic; justice;  a leading Canadian constitutional law scholar in the Post-War Period
 Elisabeth Mann-Borgese internationally recognized expert on maritime law and policy; founding members of Club of Rome; a global think tank based in Zurich, Switzerland
 W. Kent Power, QCfounding chief lecturer at the University of Alberta Faculty of Law; first to advocate permanent law reform commissions in Canada; helped shape Western Canadian common law tradition
 Sidney Smith (1920) law professor; law dean; president of University of Toronto; former secretary of state (external affairs); introduced Harvard case method into Canadian legal education
 Richard Chapman Weldonprofessor of law; founding dean
 F. Scott Murraylaw scholar and historian
 S. Michael Lynk associate professor of law at Western University and the United Nations; special rapporteur on the Situation of Human Rights in the Palestinian Territories Occupied since 1967

Business / corporate law

 Henry Bordencorporate lawyer; founding partner of Toronto law firm Borden & Elliott (now Borden Ladner Gervais); nephew of Sir Robert Borden (eighth Prime Minister of Canada)
 Frank Manning Covert, CBE (1929) – lawyer and businessman
 Purdy Crawford,  (1955)"dean emeritus of Canada's corporate [law] bar"; corporate director, former CEO of Imasco
 Sir Graham Day (1959)former chairman of Cadbury Schweppes plc; Hydro One; CEO of British Shipbuilders and the Rover Group
 Sir James Hamet Dunn (1898)major Canadian financier and industrialist
 Fred Fountain (1974)lawyer; businessman; philanthropist;  Member of the Order of Canada
 Leslie M. Little (1961)co-founding partner of Thorsteinssons; Justice of the federal Tax Court of Canada
 H. R. Milner (1911) – lawyer; businessman; former chancellor of University of King's College
 James Palmer (1952)founding partner of Burnett, Duckwoth & Palmer
 James McGregor Stewart (1914)founded Stewart McKelvey, Atlantic Canada's largest law firm; named one of Canada's ten greatest lawyers by Canadian Lawyer Magazine in 2001
 Hugh H. Turnbullchairman and managing director, The Hathaway Corporation; former director of Corporate Finance and senior V.P. of Merrill Lynch Canada; chairman of the Members Organization Committee of the Toronto Stock Exchange 
 Howard Wetston (1974)current chair of the Ontario Securities Commission

Legal activists

 Peter Dalglish (1983)international children's rights activist; founded Toronto-based Street Kids International
 Rocky Jones (1992) – political activist in the areas of human rights, race and poverty
 Lesra Martin (1997) – Canadian lawyer; renowned for helping to secure the release of Rubin "Hurricane" Carter
 Elizabeth May (1983) – president of the Sierra Club of Canada; former leader of the Green Party of Canada
 Candy Palmater (1999)comedian; activist; writer; and radio-television personality
 Pamela Palmater (1999)Mi'kmaq lawyer; professor; activist; named among the 25 most influential lawyers by Canadian Lawyer Magazine
 Henry Sylvester WilliamsTrinidadian lawyer and writer; most noted for conceiving / founding the Pan-African Movement; named 16th on a recent list of the 100 Great Black Britons
 Nick Wright (2007) – founding leader of the Green Party of Nova Scotia

Premiers

 Allan Emrys Blakeney (1947)tenth Premier of Saskatchewan
 John Buchanan (1958)20th Premier of Nova Scotia; senator
 Alex Campbell (1959)23rd Premier of Prince Edward Island
 Hon. Darrell Dexter (1987)27th Premier of Nova Scotia
 Joseph Atallah Ghiz27th Premier of Prince Edward Island and former Dean of Dalhousie Law School
 Richard Bennett Hatfield (1956)former Premier of New Brunswick
 Angus Lewis MacDonald (1921)13th Premier of Nova Scotia
 Russell MacLellan (1965)24th Premier of Nova Scotia
 Tom Marshall (1972) 11th Premier of Newfoundland and Labrador
 Hon. Jim Prentice (1980)Federal Conservative cabinet minister; 16th Premier of Alberta
 Gerald Regan (1952)former Liberal Premier of Nova Scotia
 Danny Williams (1972)9th Premier of Newfoundland and Labrador
 Clyde Wells (1962)provincial Chief Justice of the Court of Appeal and 5th Premier of Newfoundland and Labrador
 David Eby (2005) 37th premier of British Columbia

Lieutenant-governors

 Henry Poole MacKeen, OC (1921) – 22nd lieutenant-governor of Nova Scotia
 Sir John Robert Nicholson, OBEbusinessman; politician and 21st lieutenant-governor of British Columbia
 Sir Albert Walshchief justice; first lieutenant-governor for Newfoundland

Diplomats

 Michael Leir (1974) – Canadian High Commissioner to Australia

 Arts and pop culture 
 Mark Sakamoto (2003) - author of Forgiveness, A Gift from my Grandparents'', published by HarperCollins, June 2014 and winner of Canada Reads 2018.
 Barrie Dunn (1998) – actor; writer; producer best known for playing Ray in the Canadian mockumentary television program Trailer Park Boys
 Ian Hanomansing (1986) – Canadian Broadcasting Corporation journalist and anchorman

List of deans
 Camille Cameron (2021–present)
 Richard Devlin (acting Dean, 2020-2021)
 Camille Cameron (2015–2020)
 Kim Brooks (2010–15)
 Phillip Saunders, QC (2005–10)
 Dawn Russell, QC (1995–96 acting Dean, 1996–2005)
 Hon. Joseph Ghiz, QC, (1993–95)
 Philip Girard (1991–93, acting Dean)
 Innis M Christie, QC (1985–91)
 William H Charles, QC (1979–85)
 Ronald St. John Macdonald QC, CC (1972–79)
 Murray Fraser, QC (1971–72, acting Dean)
 William Andrew MacKay, QC (1964–69)
 Vincent C MacDonald, QC (1934–50)
 Sidney Earle Smith, PC (1929–34)
 John Erskine Read (1924–29)
 Donald Alexander MacRae, KC (1914–24)
 Richard Chapman Weldon, QC (1883–1914)

See also
List of law schools in Canada
 Seymour Schulich

References

External links
 Schulich School of Law
 Dalhousie Law Students' Society (LSS) 

Law
Law schools in Canada
Educational institutions established in 1883
1883 establishments in Canada